Robert Gordon University Boat Club (RGUBC) is the rowing club at Robert Gordon University in Aberdeen, Scotland. The club is affiliated to Scottish Rowing. In 2012 the club formed University Rowing Aberdeen (URA) in partnership with the Aberdeen University Boat Club so that both clubs could share resources, funding and coaching.

Competitions 
Scottish Universities Rowing Championships
Scottish Indoor Championships, Scottish Rowing Championships
BUCS and the British Rowing Championships
Aberdeen Universities' Boat Race
Strathclyde Park Regatta
Inverness Head

Aberdeen Universities' Boat Race 
Contested between Robert Gordon's University and The University of Aberdeen; it is Scotland's second oldest university boat race, behind the Scottish Boat Race competed between The University of Glasgow and The University of Edinburgh.

Honours

National champions

See also
 University rowing (UK)
 Scottish Boat Race

References

 Aberdeen universities invest in High Performance Rowing Coach

Robert Gordon University
1992 establishments in Scotland
Sports clubs established in 1992
University and college rowing clubs in Scotland
Rowing clubs in Scotland
Sports teams in Aberdeen